Jefferson Street Grounds was a baseball field located in Philadelphia, Pennsylvania. It was also known as Jefferson Park and Athletics Park. It was home to three different professional baseball teams, competing in three different leagues. Notably, it was the venue for the first game in National League history, played on April 22, 1876.

History
Baseball had first been played on the site in 1864. Several local clubs held their games there, including the historic Olympic Ball Club of Philadelphia, which had begun playing various varieties of town ball starting in the early 1830s and had adopted the "New York game" by 1860. When they began playing at the Jefferson site, the diamond was situated at the southeast corner, at 25th (first base) and Master (third base). The Olympics built a clubhouse along Master. Jefferson was behind right field. Local newspapers typically gave the ballfield location as "25th and Jefferson".

The grounds would be home to three different professional teams:
 Athletic Club of Philadelphia (also known as the Philadelphia Athletics) from 1871 to 1876. The team competed in the National Association until 1875, and in the National League of Base Ball Clubs in 1876.
 Philadelphia Base Ball Club (also known as the Philadelphia White Stockings) from 1873 to 1875, when they shared the venue with the Athletics. The White Stockings competed in the National Association.
 Philadelphia Athletics from 1883 to 1890. This franchise competed in the American Association.

25th and Jefferson, 1864 to 1875

The grounds were located on a large block bounded by Jefferson Street (north); 25th Street (east); Master Street (south); and 27th Street (west). Across the street to the south was the Spring Garden Reservoir, which has since been filled in. Although often listed as one ballpark, the 1870s diamond was located in the opposite corner of the block from the 1880s diamond. 

The facility opened to professional league baseball during 1871, as early as May 15. The club's first official National Association home game was played on June 3. The seating capacity was meager, only 5,000 seats. 

The inaugural National League game was played there, on Saturday, April 22, 1876, between Athletic and Boston; the Bostons won, 6–5. By a quirk of fate, it was the only National League game played that day, all others being rained out. This game is often pointed to as the beginning of Major League Baseball.

26th and Jefferson, 1883 to 1890 

After an early Athletics franchise was expelled from the National League following the 1876 season, the field fell into disuse. The City of Philadelphia cut 26th Street through the lot, allowing the eastern half of the large block to be developed. The western half remained vacant. A new American Association team, also called the Athletics, decided to move from their Oakdale Park after their inaugural 1882 season. 

Beginning in 1883, the Athletics leased the western half of the Jefferson Street lot, and erected a new diamond and grandstands at the northwest corner. Local newspapers then referred to the ballfield location as "26th and Jefferson", where there was an entrance gate. Also by this time, the venue was being called Athletic Grounds or Athletic Park.

The Athletics opened the new ballpark to the public on Saturday, April 7, 1883 for a preseason exhibition game against Yale University which Athletic won 12 to 0. It was reported that the new ballpark could accommodate 5,000 to 6,000 fans.

One of the largest crowds at the ballpark was recorded on April 4, 1887 for the first game of Philadelphia's 1887 City Series when 9,183 tickets were sold and an "immense crowd" turned out to see the Phillies defeat the Athletics by a score of 10 to 2.

Prior to the 1889 season, a new band stand was erected on the left field side next to the grandstand large enough for a 25-piece military band. 

On March 1, 1890, the Kensington Rovers and Philadelphia South End soccer clubs met at the ballpark in what the Philadelphia Inquirer called "the roughest and most exciting game of football (under English Association rules) that has ever been played in this city..."

The last major league game played in the park was October 11, 1890. 

The "Athletics" teams that played at the Jefferson Street Grounds do not have any direct lineage to the Philadelphia Athletics franchise that was an inaugural member of the American League in 1901, and exists today as the Oakland Athletics.

Ballpark site today
The ball field still exists in a revised form. 

The ballpark site is currently occupied by various structures including Daniel Boone Public School, also known as Camelot Academy, at 1435 N 26th St, and the Athletic Recreation Center and its ball fields. The field at the northwest corner of the lot approximates the location of the 1883–1890 diamond.

References

Further reading
SABR article on Jefferson Street ballparks
SABR article on early Philadelphia ballparks

External links
Photos of current site
Thomas Eakins painting probably set at Jefferson Street Grounds
1887 birds-eye map showing Jefferson Street grounds and Recreation Park

Defunct sports venues in Philadelphia
Defunct baseball venues in the United States
Sports venues completed in 1871
Event venues established in 1871